The Chairman of the Government of Ajara Autonomous Republic is the head of the government of the autonomous republic of Adjara. The post was created in 1991.

Chairmen of The Government

References

Politics of Adjara